Yassin Marei (born 7 November 2001) is an Egyptian professional footballer who plays as a defender for Zamalek.

Career statistics

Club

Notes

References

2001 births
Living people
Egyptian footballers
Association football defenders
Zamalek SC players
Egyptian Premier League players